Bauyrjan Momyshuly is an auyl in southeastern Kazakhstan. It is the seat of Jualy District of Jambyl Region. It is named after the military officer and author of the same name. Population: .

References 

Populated places in Jambyl Region